Journal of Insect Science is a peer-reviewed open access scientific journal covering entomology. It was established in 2001 with support from the University of Arizona by Henry Hagedorn. In 2014, after the death of Henry Hagedorn, the Entomological Society of America assumed responsibility for the journal, and it switched to publishing with Oxford University Press. The editor-in-chief is Phyllis Weintraub.

Abstracting and indexing 
The journal is abstracted and indexed in:
 Science Citation Index Expanded
 Current Contents/Agriculture, Biology & Environmental Sciences
 The Zoological Record
 BIOSIS Previews
According to the Journal Citation Reports, the journal has a 2013 impact factor of 0.921.

References

External links 
 

Publications established in 2001
Entomology journals and magazines
English-language journals
Oxford University Press academic journals
Academic journals associated with learned and professional societies of the United States
Entomological Society of America academic journals